Bekir Ozan Has (born 18 February 1985) is a Turkish footballer who most recently played for Yeşil Bursa SK. He was one of the young players of Bursaspor whom coach Samet Aybaba trusted and gave the opportunity to play 2007–2008 season. He's regarded as a promising central midfielder.

Honours 
 Bursaspor
Süper Lig (1): 2009–10

References

1985 births
Living people
Sportspeople from Manisa
Turkish footballers
Bursaspor footballers
Gaziantepspor footballers
Süper Lig players
Association football midfielders